The Third Executive (16 May 2011 – 6 May 2016) was, under the terms of the Northern Ireland Act 1998, a power-sharing coalition.

Following the 5 May 2011 elections to the fourth Northern Ireland Assembly the Democratic Unionist Party and Sinn Féin remained the two largest parties in the Assembly. The Assembly finished selecting an executive on Monday 16 May 2011.

3rd Executive of Northern Ireland

Junior Ministers

Sources
"New Executive ministers to be appointed on Monday", BBC News, 16 May 2011
"Stormont Assembly votes in new team of Ministers", by Dan Keenan, The Irish Times, 17 May 2011 (retrieved 16 May 2011)

See also 
List of Northern Ireland Executives
Members of the Northern Ireland Assembly elected in 2011

Northern Ireland Executive
Northern Ireland, Executive of the Northern Ireland Assembly 4th
Ministries of the Northern Ireland Assembly
2011 establishments in Northern Ireland
Cabinets established in 2011
2016 disestablishments in Northern Ireland
Cabinets disestablished in 2016
Ministries of Elizabeth II